Project Interchange (PI) is an American program that arranges education visits and seminars to Israel for American and international leaders in different fields. Established in 1982, PI is run by the American Jewish Committee.

Each year, PI invites 300 professionals from journalism, religion, government, health care, security, and academia to participate. Since 1982, over 6,000 participants from over 115 countries have attended PI programs.

Each PI delegation's week-long visit is customized to emphasize their specific interests. Activities include site visits and meetings with both Israeli and Palestinian professionals, policy-makers, civil society leaders, and government officials.

Impact
In 2008, PI offered 25 seminars for more than 300 participants, including university presidents, clergy, journalists, public health leaders, state officials, Rhodes Scholars, UN ambassadors, immigration and integration experts, and environmental experts. 

On their return to their home countries, PI encourages participants to write articles, give interviews, begin collaborations with partner organizations in Israel, and get involved with local issues of common concern with the Jewish community.

Notable Alumni

 Gillian Bird, Former Australian Ambassador to the United Nations
 Lonnie Bunch III, Founding Director, National Museum of African American History and Culture
 Juan José Gómez Camacho, Former Ambassador of Mexico to the United Nations
 Steve Chabot, Former Member of the U.S. House of Representatives
 Michael V. Drake, Former President, The Ohio State University 
 Ajit Doval, National Security Advisor to the Prime Minister of India
 Michael Fitts, President, Tulane University
 John Anderson Fry, President, Drexel University
 Carlos Giménez, Former Mayor, Miami-Dade County, Florida
 Christy Haubegger, Founder, Latina magazine
 Alberto Ibargüen, CEO of the Knight Foundation
 Ioannes Kasoulides, Minister of Foreign Affairs, Cyprus
 Ro Khanna, Member of the U.S. House of Representatives
 George Muñoz, banking executive
 Péter Niedermüller, Former Member, European Parliament
 Annise Parker, Former Mayor, Houston, Texas
 Martha E. Pollack, President of Cornell University
 Kasim Reed, Former Mayor, Atlanta, Georgia
 Ramona Romero, Former General Counsel, U.S. Department of Agriculture
 Jacky Rosen, U.S. Senator from Nevada
 David Skorton, Former Secretary of the Smithsonian Institution
 Sonia Sotomayor, Associate Justice, Supreme Court of the United States
 Ted Strickland, Former Member of Congress
 Holden Thorp, Former Chancellor, University of North Carolina at Chapel Hill
 Henry T. Yang, Chancellor, University of California, Santa Barbara

References

Further reading

Selected list of participants 2011 
Selected list of participants 2013
 Selected alumni quotes

External links
 Official website

Non-profit organizations based in Washington, D.C.
Israel–United States relations
American Jewish Committee